Alexandra Milchan (born 1 January 1972) is an Israeli businesswoman and film producer based in Los Angeles and Tel Aviv who runs EMJAG Productions. She is the daughter of Arnon Milchan, the founder of Regency Enterprises, and Brigitte Genmaire, a French model. In 2007, Variety named Milchan to their list of Top 10 Producers to Watch.

Biography 
Milchan was born in Tel Aviv, Israel but grew up in Paris. She attended Emerson College, graduating with a Bachelor of Arts degree in 1994.  Milchan then relocated to Los Angeles to work in the entertainment industry.

Milchan began her film career in 1993 as an assistant at her father's company New Regency, eventually working her way up to senior roles. By 2000 father named her vice president of production at New Regency Productions. She left the company in the mid 2000s, but returned as Executive VP of production in 2011. During her first 13-year stint at New Regency, Milchan was involved with films such as  Heat, A Time to Kill, and L.A. Confidential.

In 2013, Milchan received her first executive producer credit for The Wolf of Wall Street, but only after filing a lawsuit against the main financing company for the film regarding producer credits and fees.

EMJAG Productions is a joint production firm that Milchan runs with her husband Scott Lambert, a producer and talent agent. The pair have three children.

Filmography

Executive producer

Producer

References 

Israeli businesspeople
Israeli film producers
Israeli Jews
Living people
Emerson College alumni
1972 births